This is a List of compositions by Josef Tal; Josef Tal website.

Notes

Tal